Kyriakos "Koulis" Iosifidis (born 27 January 1946 in Piraeus) is a retired Greek water polo player and water polo coach. As a player, he was part of the Greece men's national water polo team at the 1968 and 1972 Olympic Games. and at club level member of Greek powerhouse Ethnikos Piraeus.

Iosifidis was the head coach of Greece women's national water polo team that won the silver medal at the 2004 Summer Olympics in Athens.

References

External links
 
 Ιστορική πρόκριση για την εθνική ομάδα πόλο γυναικών (in Greek)

1946 births
Living people
Greek male water polo players
Greek water polo coaches
Olympic water polo players of Greece
Water polo players at the 1968 Summer Olympics
Water polo players at the 1972 Summer Olympics
Greece women's national water polo team coaches
Water polo coaches at the 2000 Summer Olympics
Water polo coaches at the 2004 Summer Olympics
Water polo coaches at the 2008 Summer Olympics
Ethnikos Piraeus Water Polo Club players
Water polo players from Piraeus